North Galloway Township is an inactive township in Christian County, in the U.S. state of Missouri.

North Galloway Township was named in memory of Mr. Galloway, a casualty of the Civil War.

References

Townships in Missouri
Townships in Christian County, Missouri